Amar Abdirahman Ahmed Fatah (born 19 February 2004) is a Swedish professional footballer who plays as a winger for Belgian club Lommel, on loan from the French club Troyes.

Club career
On 19 November 2021, Ahmed Fatah signed his first professional contract with AIK, until the end of 2024.

On 30 August 2022, Ahmed Fatah signed a five-year contract with Troyes in France for a sum of €5 million.

On 31 January 2023, Ahmed Fatah joined Lommel in Belgium on loan for the rest of the 2022–23 season.

International career
Born in Sweden, Abdirahman Ahmed is of Somali descent. He is a youth international for Sweden.

References

External links

SvenskFotboll profile

2004 births
Swedish people of Somali descent
Sportspeople from Stockholm County
Living people
Swedish men's footballers
Sweden youth international footballers
Association football wingers
AIK Fotboll players
ES Troyes AC players
Lommel S.K. players
Allsvenskan players
Championnat National 3 players
Challenger Pro League players
Swedish expatriate footballers
Expatriate footballers in France
Swedish expatriate sportspeople in France
Expatriate footballers in Belgium
Swedish expatriate sportspeople in Belgium